Neoncicola is a genus of parasitic worms belonging to the family Oligacanthorhynchidae.

Species:

Neoncicola artibei 
Neoncicola avicola 
Neoncicola bursata 
Neoncicola curvata 
Neoncicola novellae 
Neoncicola pintoi 
Neoncicola potosi 
Neoncicola sinensis 
Neoncicola skrjabini

References

Archiacanthocephala
Acanthocephala genera